Loren Miller may refer to:

 Loren Miller (activist), American civic reformer and libertarian activist
 Loren Miller (judge) (1903–1967), American judge in the California Superior Court